Geoffrey Curgenven Bolton  (5 November 1931 – 3 September 2015) was an Australian historian, academic and writer.

Life
He attended Wesley College, Perth from 1943 to 1947. He published works on Australian history, authoring 13 books, his final being Land of Vision and Mirage: Western Australia since 1826.

His book, Daphne Street, published by Fremantle Press, describes his early surrounds, and is an attempt to write national history at the local level.

He was a frequent contributor to radio in Western Australia and did much to bring Western Australian history and socio-political development to life. 

Part of his career was spent setting up the Australian Studies Centre (now the Menzies Centre) at the University of London in the United Kingdom.

He was Chairperson of the Western Australian Maritime Museum's Archaeology Advisory Committee.

Bolton was a Fellow of the Royal Historical Society (London), Fellow of the Academy of the Social Sciences in Australia, Fellow of the Australian Academy of the Humanities, and Fellow of the Royal Western Australian Historical Society. He served as the Chancellor of Murdoch University from 2002 to 2006.

In 2008, he published a single-volume short history of Western Australia since the start of British settlement in 1826, covering the social, cultural, political and economic development of the most geographically isolated area in the world.

Bolton died on 4 September 2015, in Perth, at the age of 83. He was married to Carol Grattan and has two sons and five grandchildren.

Awards
Bolton was the recipient of several prestigious awards including his appointment as Officer of the Order of Australia (1984) in recognition of distinguished service to Australia for his services to education.

In 2001, Bolton received the Centenary of Federation prize at the New South Wales Premier's History Awards for Edmund Barton: The One Man for the Job, a biography of Australia's first Prime Minister. The one-off prize was intended to recognize a major work contributing  to the understanding of Australian political, social and cultural issues during the Federation period. The biography was also shortlisted for the Colin Roderick Award (2000) and the National Biography Award (2001).

Since 2004, the State Records Office of Western Australia has hosted The Geoffrey Bolton Lecture series, acknowledging his service on various committees of the State Archive and his long period of use and promotion of archives. The aims of the Geoffrey Bolton Lecture are to encourage the expression of ideas and debate about the meaning and nature of history, culture and society, grounded in archival research; and to provide archival and historical context to national debate on contemporary issues. 

In recognition of his major contribution to Australian history and the community, Bolton was named the Western Australia's 2006 Australian of the Year.

Memorials
There are a number of eponymous memorials to Bolton. 

In 2014 a new street, central to the Elizabeth Quay waterfront development, then under construction, was named Geoffrey Bolton Avenue in acknowledgement of the contribution made by Bolton to conserve, record and teach the history of Western Australia.

At a dedication ceremony held on 21 February 2017, Murdoch University renamed its library The Geoffrey Bolton Library to recognize Bolton's long association with the University.

Publications
Citations to this author abbreviate his name to G. C. Bolton.
 Alexander Forrest: his life and times. 1958
 The Passing of the Irish Act of Union: a study in parliamentary politics. 1966
 Dick Boyer, an Australian humanist. 1967
 A fine country to starve in. 1972  (reprinted 1994)
 Britain's Legacy Overseas. 1973 
 Spoils and spoilers : Australians make their environment 1788–1980. 1981  (second edition 1992)
 History of Royal Perth Hospital. 1982 
 It had better be a good one : the first ten years of Murdoch University. 1985 
 John Ramsden Wollaston: the making of a pioneer priest. 1985 
 The Oxford history of Australia. Volume 5, 1942–1988 : the middle way. 1990 
 Who owns Australia's past?. 1993 
 Daphne Street. 1996 
 Claremont: a history. 1999 
 Edmund Barton: The One Man for the Job. 2000 
 The Fuss That Never Ended: The Life and Work of Geoffrey Blainey. 2003  (joint author with Stuart Macintyre, Deborah Gare and Tom Stannage)
 May it please Your Honour : a history of the Supreme Court of Western Australia 1861–2005. 2005  (with Geraldine Byrne)
 Land of Vision and Mirage: Western Australia since 1826. 2008 
 "A thousand miles away"
 Paul Hasluck: A Life. 2014

Academic career
  Educated at the University of Western Australia and Oxford University
  Research Fellow at the Australian National University in 1957
  Senior Lecturer at Monash University in 1962
  Professor of Modern History at the University of Western Australia in 1966
  Foundation Professor of History at Murdoch University in 1973
  Pro Vice-Chancellor of Murdoch University from 1973 to 1975
  Dean of the School of Social Inquiry at Murdoch University from 1976 to 1978
  Visiting Commonwealth Fellow at St John's College, Cambridge 1978 and 1979.
  Professor and head of the Australian Studies Centre at the University of London from 1982 until 1985
  Professor of Australian History at the University of Queensland in 1989
  Professor of History at Edith Cowan University, Western Australia
  Retired from academia in 1996
  Chancellor of Murdoch University from July 2002 to November 2006.

References

 Citation for Fellowship: Geoffrey Curgenven Bolton in Early Days  11(3), 1997.

1931 births
2015 deaths
Historians from Western Australia
Officers of the Order of Australia
Fellows of the Royal Historical Society
Fellows of the Academy of the Social Sciences in Australia
Writers from Perth, Western Australia
People educated at Wesley College, Perth
University of Western Australia alumni
Academic staff of Monash University
Historians of Australia
Academic staff of Edith Cowan University
Academic staff of the University of Queensland
Alumni of the University of Oxford
Academic staff of the Australian National University
Australian Book Review people
Fellows of the Australian Academy of the Humanities